Merveille Kikasa (born 14 February 1999) is a Congolese football midfielder.

International goals
Scores and results list DR Congo's goal tally first.

References

1999 births
Living people
Democratic Republic of the Congo footballers
Democratic Republic of the Congo international footballers
AC Léopards players
AS Vita Club players
Association football midfielders
Democratic Republic of the Congo expatriate footballers
Expatriate footballers in the Republic of the Congo
Democratic Republic of the Congo expatriate sportspeople in the Republic of the Congo
2022 African Nations Championship players
Democratic Republic of the Congo A' international footballers